This list of longest tunnels ranks tunnels that are at least  long. Only continuous tunnels are included. Pipelines, even those that are buried, are excluded. The longest tunnels have been constructed for water distribution, followed by tunnels for railways.


World's longest tunnels (in use)

World's longest tunnels (under construction)

World's longest tunnels (advanced planning stage)

World's longest tunnels (abandoned)

See also

 List of long tunnels by type – contains separate tables for railroad, subway, vehicular, bicycle, water/aquaducts, and also for different building techniques
 List of deepest caves
 List of deepest mines
 Lists of tunnels
List of longest railway tunnels
 List of long railway tunnels in China
 List of longest subway tunnel sections
 List of longest bridges

Notes

References

Length
Tunnels
Tunnels
Tunnels